Shirin Ab (also Romanized as Shīrīn Āb) is a village in Holayjan Rural District, in the Central District of Izeh County, Khuzestan Province, Iran. At the 2011 census, its population was at 52, in  11 households.

References 

Populated places in Izeh County